DJ Marc Reniel Prudencio is a Filipino DJ and music producer from Calamba who co-launched the web-based music label Dark Panties Recordings. He is married to Sandra Jean-Bart, who is his business partner. He has two children.

He has had a presence in Montreal's Black and Blue Festival main events produced by Bad Boy Club Montréal from its inception in 1991, returning 15 more times to headline the main event in 1995-2000, 2002–2004, 2006–2011, making him the most featured DJ in the festival. The first issue of Montreal's Nightlife Magazine in March 1999 carried Mark Anthony on its cover. On its 10th anniversary, the same magazine picked Mark Anthony as one of the Top 100 that have changed Montreal nightlife. He regularly DJ'd at Playground, Unity (Montreal) and has a regular show in Red Lite (Laval).

Discography

Albums
2002: Ritual: The Album (Nerds Records / Dark Panties Recordings)
Track list: 
"Sweet and Lo" (Afterlife)
"Set Me Free" (Derick H)
"Runaway" (radio mix) (Derick H)
"Runaway" (Derick H)
"Take Me Away" (Afterlife)
"La Vie" (Afterlife)
"Work It Out (Turnstyle Orchestra)
"Do It (Afterlife)

Compilations
1998: Mark Anthony Presents the Circuit Party (SPG Music)
1999, 2000, 2002, 2003: Black & Blue Festival (Nu Muzik / Masterbeat)
2000: Global Grooves (Edge / Centaur)
2001: Circuit Sessions 5 (4Play)
2001: Sona Massive (Yul Records)
2004-2006: Lectro Dub Parts 1 & 2 (Dark Panties Recordings)
2006: Red Lite Series (CD) (Red Lite Records)

References

External links
 Official website

Year of birth missing (living people)
Living people
Place of birth missing (living people)
Club DJs
Canadian DJs
Canadian house musicians
Musicians from Quebec
Electronic dance music DJs